L'Ajoupa-Bouillon, commonly known as L'Ajoupa, is a commune and town in the French overseas department and region, and island, of Martinique.

Geography

Climate
L'Ajoupa-Bouillon has a tropical rainforest climate (Köppen climate classification Af).

Tourism
Nature aficionados can enjoy the L'Ajoupa Gardens, with a great variety of plants and flowers. Furthermore, a long walk called "Gorges De La Falaise", starting from the commune centre, lead the interested people to the core of the tropical forest, with some marked halts at cascades and important points.

Population

See also
Communes of Martinique

References

External links

Communes of Martinique
Populated places in Martinique